William Snow  otherwise known as Bill or Billy was an anti-smoking activist, a co-founder of BUGA UP (Billboard Utilising Graffitists Against Unhealthy Promotions) and contributor to the banning of tobacco advertising and the realisation of a smoke-free environment in Australia.  In addition to his anti-smoking activities, he was an avid campaigner against nuclear weapons and destruction of the environment and was a strong supporter of Aboriginal Rights. Bill died of a ruptured aorta on 8 March, 2018. He is survived by his daughter Emily and his sisters Dorothy and Joan.

Early life
Bill was born on 31 January 1938, the youngest of Alison and Lyall Snow's three children. He grew up in Drummoyne and attended Fort Street High School where he won an award for debating and graduated with the leaving certificate. Billy began work as a printer’s mechanic and rebelled against his strict Salvation Army upbringing by immersing himself in the early Rock 'n' Roll scene. After a period of National Service he took off for a decade long adventure of sailing and backpacking around the world. He sailed through SE Asia and the Mediterranean and travelled the length of the Americas, working as a printer in Japan, London and San Francisco. He met Rosemarie Gosling in London in 1964; they set off to Europe together and married in Sydney in 1967. Their daughter Emily was born in 1972. After separating from his wife Bill moved to Bundeena, a village within Sydney’s Royal National Park, in 1979.

Whilst in Bundeena Bill was contracted by the University of Sydney to print testamurs for graduating students and acquired a hand-operated letterpress printing machine to print them. This printing method was preferred because the typed letters were embossed into the paper. Bill continued to print the testamurs until the technology was superseded by laser printing in the 1990s.

Cigarette advertising and smoking
Bill Snow was one of Australia's early environmental and fresh air campaigners.  When a fellow anti-smoking campaigner, Brian McBride, sued a bus driver for assaulting him with tobacco smoke on a non-smoking bus, Bill and Gayle Russell came forward in his support. This action led to the formation of the Non-Smokers Rights Movement in 1978, later to become the Non Smokers Movement of Australia.

Frustrated at the lack of action on tobacco he began to write graffiti on tobacco billboards in 1977, which were more than half the outdoor advertising at that time.   In 1978 Simon Chapman, and others involved in public health who, concerned about tobacco advertising, formed a group called MOP UP (Movement Opposed to the Promotion of Unhealthy Products) but after the meeting Bill, Geoff Coleman and Ric Bolzan decided that direct action would be more effective using satire on billboards, linked by the simple words BUGA UP (Billboard Utilising Graffitists Against Unhealthy Promotions).  The idea was that anyone could see the concept, pick up a spray can and contribute to the war against tobacco promotion and disease.  A blank billboard was found, the acronym was painted and publicised with a catalogue illustrated with photographed billboards and leaflets, but the most powerful message was sprayed by people on many billboards.

Bill travelled in his van with 'BUGA UP Rules OK' painted on the front, while rainbows and dolphin motifs were painted on the sides by his partner and fellow graffitist Danielle Kluth. This mobile display helped to publicise his environmental causes.  He drove around with spray cans and a bucket with paint bombs floating in it, just in case they were required.  He probably re-faced more billboards than anyone else, with the possible exception of Fred Cole, but he was not one to rush a job. He could linger at a billboard for half an hour, using his printer’s eye to ensure his alterations were ‘perfect’. Needless to say, he was arrested on numerous occasions and spent time in gaol 'on principle' rather than pay a fine. 

His anti-smoking actions took many forms, for example he collected cigarette butts from sacred sites and elsewhere, put them in large plastic bottles with labels like ‘Collected at Ayers Rock (Uluru) with information about how much damage they did to wildlife, and set up displays at fairs and schools to increase awareness and encourage action against tobacco and environmental pollution.  He was an engaging character, though not always tactful and sometimes plain cantankerous. He would confront tobacco company salespeople and other representatives and then engage them about the error of their ways.  His van was used as a 'BUGA UP Embassy' outside Leo Burnett’s (tobacco) Advertising Agency in North Sydney in 1984.  In order to get rid of the 'Embassy' the Police had to impound the van but waited in vain for the registered owner, 'Philip Morris', to claim it.

Favouring preventive action at all levels, he would visit Police stations with leaflets and explain to the somewhat startled officers that BUGA UP was to be active in their area and it would be appreciated if the health activists were just allowed to get on with the job.  Despite this he was arrested and spent time in gaol for his billboard graffiti, as naturally he refused to pay the fine.  But the fact that this happened made BUGA UP the most radical health promotion group in the world, which served to make all other anti-tobacco actions moderate, and re-frame the debate globally. Australia was the first major country to ban tobacco advertising and the loss of legitimacy by the tobacco industry had huge implications for tobacco and health policy in Australia and worldwide.

Political activism
Bill was an avid campaigner against using nuclear energy to provide electricity and destruction of the environment.  He put his sailing skills to good use in seaborne protests against nuclear armed warships from the United States sailing into Sydney Harbour.

He was a great believer in community action and was an early supporter of the Bundagen Community on the mid North Coast. Bill also spent much time with Indigenous Australians and visiting their communities.  He funded a trip to England with Burnum Burnum in 1988, Australia's Bicentennial Year, when Burnum Burnum planted the Aboriginal flag on the beach near the white cliffs of Dover and claimed Britain for the Aboriginal people, as the British had done to the Aboriginal people in Australia.

Filmography
 Billboard Bandits A short History of B.U.G.A. U.P. by Kathyn Milliss

See also
Billboard Utilising Graffitists Against Unhealthy Promotions
Lord Bloody Wog Rolo

References

External links
 The St George & Sutherland Shire Leader - Bill Snow obituary
 The Sydney morning Herald - Bill Snow obituary
 BUGA UP website - Bill Snow tribute

1938 births
2018 deaths
Australian health activists
Anti-smoking activists
People from Sydney